= GDR championship women's basketball =

Basketball competition in East Germany

- Sport: Basketball
- Founded: 1954
- First season: 1954-55
- Folded: 1990
- Country: East Germany
- Continent: FIBA Europe (Europe)
- Level on pyramid: 1

The GDR championship women's basketball was the highest women's professional club basketball competition in East Germany.
